The Zvezda K-36 is a series of ejection seats made by NPP Zvezda. Variants of this ejection seat have been used on a variety of aircraft, including the Su-25, Su-27, MiG-29, Su-30 MKI and the Su-57.

Design
The K-36 Ejection seat provides emergency escape for a crew member in a wide range of speeds and altitudes of aircraft flight, from zero altitude, zero speed (zero-zero) upwards, and can be used in conjunction with protective equipment, such as pressure suits and anti-g garments. The seat consists of the ejection rocket firing mechanism, gear box, headrest rescue system with a dome stowed in the headrest, and other operating systems all of which are aimed at providing a safe bail-out.

Operational ejections

Notable ejections using the K-36 occurred at the 1989 Paris Air Show when Anatoly Kvochur successfully  completed a low-altitude ejection from a MiG-29 just prior to ground impact. Two more pilots survived when a pair of MiG-29s collided over Fairford, England, in 1993 at the Royal International Air Tattoo. A first person view video of an ejection during the Russia Ukraine war was posted to the internet on October 22 2022.

Variants
 K-36D and K-36DM: Used on the MiG-29, Su-27, Su-30
 K-36D-3.5: Improved variant providing accommodation for pilots with sitting heights from 810 to 980 mm
 K-36D-5: Improved variant for the Sukhoi Su-57
 K-36LM: Used in the Tu-160 Blackjack
 K-36RB: Variant used on Buran programme
 K-36VM: Automatic ejection system (SKE) used successfully 20/20 times in the Yak-38

References

External links
 K-36

Ejection seats